Godfrey Stillman Rockefeller (May 1, 1899 – February 23, 1983) was an American financier and chairman of Cranston Print Works, a Rockefeller-owned textile company.

Early life
Godfrey Stillman Rockefeller was born on May 1, 1899, and was the second son of William Goodsell Rockefeller (1870–1922) and Sarah Elizabeth "Elsie" Stillman (1872–1935). His paternal grandfather was William Rockefeller Jr. (1841–1922), brother of John D. Rockefeller, the co-founders of Standard Oil.  His maternal grandfather was James Jewett Stillman (1850–1918), a businessman who was chairman of the board of directors of the National City Bank.  He was a member of the Skull and Bones society and graduated from Yale University in 1921.

Career
Rockefeller served as a second lieutenant in World War One and served as a lieutenant colonel during World War Two.  He was partner in Clark, Dodge & Company; stockholder in the Enterprise Development Corporation; chairman of the Cranston Print Works; director of Benson & Hedges; trustee of the Fairfield Foundation; and had been a director of Freeport-McMoRan since December 1931.

Personal life
He was married to Helen Gratz, sister-in-law of Edward H. Watson. They were the parents of five children:
Godfrey Anderson Rockefeller (1924–2010).
Peter Rockefeller
Lucy Rockefeller Stewart
Marion Rockefeller Stone
Audrey Rockefeller Blair
Rockefeller died on February 23, 1983, of leukemia in Greenwich, Connecticut.

See also
Rockefeller family

References

External links 
 The Benno C. Schmidt Page
 Freeport Sulphur's Powerful Board of Directors

1899 births
1983 deaths
American people of English descent
American people of German descent
American people of Scotch-Irish descent
Rockefeller family
American financiers
Yale University alumni